The White House chief of staff is the head of the Executive Office of the President of the United States and a cabinet position, in the federal government of the United States.

The chief of staff is a political appointee of the president of the United States who does not require Senate confirmation, and who serves at the pleasure of the President. While not a legally required role, all presidents since Harry S. Truman have appointed a chief of staff.

In the administration of Joe Biden, the current chief of staff is Jeff Zients, who succeeded Ron Klain on February 8, 2023. The chief of staff is the most senior political appointee in the White House. 
The position is widely recognized as one of great power and influence, owing to daily contact with the president of the United States and control of the Executive Office of the President of the United States.

Historical background
Originally, the duties now performed by the chief of staff belonged to the president's private secretary and were fulfilled by crucial confidantes and policy advisers such as George B. Cortelyou, Joseph Tumulty, and Louis McHenry Howe to presidents Theodore Roosevelt, Woodrow Wilson, and Franklin Roosevelt, respectively. The private secretary served as the president's de facto chief aide, in a role that combined personal and professional assignments of highly delicate and demanding natures, requiring great skill and utmost discretion. The job of gatekeeper and overseeing the president's schedule was separately delegated to the appointments secretary, as with aide Edwin "Pa" Watson.

From 1933 to 1939, as he greatly expanded the scope of the federal government's policies and powers in response to the Great Depression, President Roosevelt relied on his famous 'Brain Trust' of top advisers. Although working directly for the president, they were often appointed to vacant positions in federal agencies and departments, whence they drew their salaries since the White House lacked statutory or budgetary authority to create staff positions. It was not until 1939, during Roosevelt's second term in office, that the foundations of the modern White House staff were created using a formal structure. Roosevelt was able to persuade Congress to approve the creation of the Executive Office of the President, which would report directly to the president. During World War II, Roosevelt created the position of "Chief of Staff to the Commander-in-Chief" for his principal military adviser, Fleet Admiral William D. Leahy.

In 1946, in response to the rapid growth of the U.S. government's executive branch, the position of "Assistant to the President of the United States" was established. Charged with the affairs of the White House, it was the immediate predecessor to the modern chief of staff. It was in 1953, under Republican President Dwight D. Eisenhower, that the president's preeminent assistant was designated the "White House Chief of Staff".

Assistant to the president became a rank generally shared by the chief of staff along with the other most senior presidential aides such as the White House counsel, the White House press secretary, and others. This new system did not catch on immediately however. Presidents Kennedy and Johnson still relied on their appointments secretaries instead, and it was not until the Nixon administration that the chief of staff took over maintenance of the President's schedule. This concentration of power in the Nixon and Ford White House (whose last chief of staff was Dick Cheney) led presidential candidate Jimmy Carter to campaign in 1976 with the promise that he would not appoint a chief of staff.  And indeed, for the first two and a half years of his presidency, he appointed no one to the post.

Average tenure in office 
The average tenure for a White House chief of staff is a little more than 18 months. The inaugural chief of staff, John R. Steelman, under Harry S. Truman, was the president's only chief of staff; Kenneth O'Donnell alone served in the position during John F. Kennedy's unfinished term of 34 months in office. Andrew Card and Denis McDonough each served at least one entire presidential term of office under presidents George W. Bush and Barack Obama, respectively.

Political career implications 
Many individuals chosen for the role of White House chiefs of staff are former politicians in their own right. Numerous past officeholders have gone on to resume or progress their political careers after their stint in the White House, including in elected office or in a Cabinet position. Examples of this include:

 Lyndon Johnson's chief of staff W. Marvin Watson, who became the Postmaster General later in the term
 Richard Nixon's chief of staff Alexander Haig, a U.S. Army officer with his capstone military position being that of Supreme Allied Commander in Europe. Haig later became Secretary of State under Ronald Reagan and ran unsuccessfully for President in the 1988 presidential election
 Gerald Ford's chief of staff Dick Cheney later became a congressman for Wyoming, Secretary of Defense under George H. W. Bush, and vice president under George W. Bush
 Donald Rumsfeld, another chief of staff under Ford, later became Secretary of Defense in the Ford administration and decades later in the George W. Bush administration. 
 Barack Obama's first chief of staff Rahm Emanuel left a senior leadership position in the House of Representatives to take the role. Emanuel later successfully ran for Mayor of Chicago, and would later become Ambassador to Japan
 Jack Lew, Obama's fourth chief of staff, was later appointed Secretary of the Treasury
 Denis McDonough, Obama's fifth chief of staff, was later appointed Secretary of Veterans Affairs under President Joe Biden

Role

Chris Whipple, author of The Gatekeepers: How the White House Chiefs of Staff Define Every Presidency, loosely describes the role of a White House chief of staff through his interview with former president Barack Obama: 

The responsibilities of the chief of staff are both managerial and advisory and may include the following:
Selecting senior White House staffers and supervising their offices' activities;
Managing and designing the overall structure of the White House staff system;
Control the flow of people into the Oval Office;
Manage the flow of information to and decisions from the Resolute Desk (with the White House staff secretary);
Directing, managing and overseeing all policy development
Protecting the political interests of the president;
Negotiating legislation and appropriating funds with United States Congress leaders, Cabinet secretaries, and extra-governmental political groups to implement the president's agenda; and
Advise on any and usually various issues set by the president.

These responsibilities have recently extended to firing of senior staff members. In the case of Omarosa Manigault Newman, who published a tape she alleged was made in the Situation Room of her firing by Chief of Staff John Kelly, the chief of staff said that his decision for her departure was non-negotiable and that "the staff and everyone on the staff works for me and not the president."

Richard Nixon's first chief of staff, H. R. Haldeman, garnered a reputation in Washington for the iron hand he wielded in the position—famously referring to himself as "the president's son-of-a-bitch", he was a rigid gatekeeper who would frequently meet with administration officials in place of the president, and then report himself to Nixon on the officials' talking points. Journalist Bob Woodward, in his books All the President's Men (1974) and The Secret Man (2005), wrote that many of his sources, including Mark Felt, later revealed as "Deep Throat", displayed a genuine fear of Haldeman.

List of White House chiefs of staff

|-style="text-align:center;"
|colspan=8|VacantApril 30, 1973 – May 4, 1973

|-style="text-align:center;"
|colspan=8|VacantJanuary 20, 1977 – July 18, 1979

See also
 Chief of staff
 White House Deputy Chief of Staff
 Chief of Staff to the Vice President of the United States
 Officer of the United States
 Staff and line

Notes

References

United States presidential advisors
Chief Of Staff
Executive Office of the President of the United States
Cabinet of the United States